Native News Online is an Indigenous-focused news publication owned by Indian Country Media LLC. It was founded in 2011 by current publisher and editor Levi Rickert, a tribal citizen of the Prairie Band Potawatomi Nation, who has covered multiple stories in Indian country as a journalist over many years.

References

2011 establishments in the United States
Native American newspapers